Admiral Charles Eustace Anson, CB, MVO (3 December 1859 – 28 April 1940) was a Royal Navy officer.

A member of the Anson family, Charles Eustace Anson was the son of the Rev Frederick Anson, Canon of Windsor, and of the Hon Caroline Maria, daughter of George John Venables-Vernon, 5th Baron Vernon. He entered HMS Britannia as a cadet in July 1872.

Anson was the father of the electrical engineer Horatio St George Anson and the writer Peter Anson.

References 

1859 births
1940 deaths
Anson family
Companions of the Order of the Bath
Members of the Royal Victorian Order
Royal Navy admirals
Royal Navy admirals of World War I
Royal Navy personnel of the Anglo-Egyptian War